Yegor Igorevich Teslenko (born 31 January 2001) is a Russian football player who plays for FC Rubin Kazan.

Club career
He made his debut in the Russian Football National League for FC KAMAZ Naberezhnye Chelny on 10 July 2021 in a game against FC Alania Vladikavkaz.

On 17 February 2022, Teslenko signed a contract until the summer of 2026 with FC Rubin Kazan. He made his Russian Premier League debut for Rubin on 14 March 2022 against FC Rostov.

Career statistics

References

External links
 
 Profile by Russian Football National League

2001 births
Sportspeople from Krasnodar
Living people
Russian footballers
Association football defenders
PFC CSKA Moscow players
FC Urozhay Krasnodar players
FC KAMAZ Naberezhnye Chelny players
FC Rubin Kazan players
Russian Second League players
Russian First League players
Russian Premier League players